George Halas McCaskey is the current chairman of the National Football League's Chicago Bears. He replaced his brother Michael McCaskey as chairman in 2011.

Biography
McCaskey, the eighth-oldest child of Bears owner Virginia Halas McCaskey and Ed McCaskey (who himself was a former Bears chairman), was originally an assistant state attorney in Lee and DeKalb counties. McCaskey also worked in television after graduating with a bachelor's degree (1978) from Arizona State University and a Juris Doctor degree (1981) from Arizona State University College of Law, and was a reporter for an NBC affiliate in Peoria. He was the team's senior director of ticket operations since the Bears 1991 season, and was a member of the team's board of directors since 2004.

In 2011, during the NFL lockout, McCaskey's brother Michael retired as chairman of the club after 12 years. Before he assumed his position, he met with Chicago Blackhawks owner Rocky Wirtz, as well as White Sox and Bulls owner Jerry Reinsdorf. Jerry Jones of the Dallas Cowboys was the first NFL owner with whom he met. McCaskey reflected on meeting Jones, commenting, "He was very gracious, very accommodating. He’s a fascinating guy. I really enjoyed visiting with him, getting to know him. We sat in a suite at Cowboys Stadium and looked out over the field. We then went downstairs and bumped into a tour group. As soon as they saw who he was, they were going crazy. They were taking pictures and he was chatting them up."

McCaskey is the second-highest figure in the Bears organization below his mother Virginia, with team president and CEO Ted Phillips reporting to him. While the president oversees structural changes such as hiring and firing the general manager, the ownership provides input; McCaskey explained in 2012, shortly after the departure of general manager Jerry Angelo, that he did not "feel any particular need to place a personal stamp on the Bears, that my job was to work with and in support of the president and CEO."

References

External links
 Chicago Bears bio

Year of birth missing (living people)
Living people
Chicago Bears executives
Arizona State University alumni
Halas family
Sandra Day O'Connor College of Law alumni